Rolueckia is a lichen genus in the family Gomphillaceae. It was circumscribed in 2018 to contain a single species, the lichenicolous fungus Taitaia aurea. This species is characterized by aggregated ascomata with yellow margins, and salmon-red discs that originate from a single base. It is found in tropical montane forests in Kenya, where it grows on thalli of the lichen Crocodia.

References

Ostropales
Lichen genera
Taxa described in 2018
Ostropales genera